The Ulldecona Dam, known locally as Embassament d'Ulldecona or Pantà d'Ulldecona is a gravity dam located in the Tinença de Benifassà and the Ports de Tortosa-Beseit mountains, within the La Pobla de Benifassà municipal limits, Valencian Community, Spain.

The dam was built in 1967 and was financed by farmers from the town of Ulldecona, hence its name.

Description
The reservoir is at the confluence of three seasonal rivers, the Barranc de la Fou, Barranc de Teulatí, also known as Barranc de la Tenalla, and the Barranc de la Pobla, all part of the Sénia River basin. 

Its reservoir reaches a surface of 817 ha with a capacity of 11 hm³. 
This dam belongs to the Hydrographic Confederation of the Xúquer (Confederación Hidrográfica del Júcar/Confederació Hidrogràfica del Xúquer). The abandoned village of Mangraner is located at the northwestern end of the reservoir not far from the shore.

Tourism
The dam attracts tourists, especially in the summer. Right by the reservoir there is a restaurant, accommodation, pedalos and information about hiking routes in the neighboring karstic mountainous area. The easiest way to reach the Ulldecona Dam is from La Sénia town located close by.

References

External links

Ulldecona Tourism

Reservoirs in the Valencian Community
Baix Maestrat
Dams completed in 1967
Dams in Spain
Gravity dams
Ports de Tortosa-Beseit

de:Talsperre Ulldecona